Olov Hugo Göllors (16 November 1919 – 7 February 1977) was a Swedish pole vaulter. He competed at the 1946 European Athletics Championships and 1948 Summer Olympics and finished in fifth and seventh place, respectively. He won the national title in 1942 and 1947.

References

1919 births
1977 deaths
Swedish male pole vaulters
Olympic athletes of Sweden
Athletes (track and field) at the 1948 Summer Olympics